The Canadian Pacific Police Service (CPPS) is a private railroad police force enforcing safety and policing along Canadian Pacific Railway properties and rail lines in Canada and the United States, including limited sections of the Milton line of GO Transit in the Greater Toronto Area.

History
The Canadian Pacific Police Service is one of the oldest police services in Canada. CP Police Service, formerly CP Railway Police, have a long and storied past within Canada and CP Rail is a part of Canada's history. Railway police were called upon many times to police railway towns, and to keep the peace during the building of the Canadian Railways from coast to coast. The railway police history dates many years and continues the tradition of protecting Canada's vast section of railway.

In past years they had been downsized and numbered under 100 officers across Canada, however they are currently expanding their numbers across Canada. CP Police are also deployed throughout the CP Rail System in the USA.

Mandate

Canadian Pacific Police Service are responsible for all aspects of railway security. They are duly appointed and armed federal police officers that gather their authority in Canada via the Railway Safety Act as well as other acts.

The Railway Safety Act is a federal act that allows for any federal railway to appoint officers as police constables. These police constables have all the powers of a regular police officer as it relates to the protection of property owned, possessed or administered by a railway company and the protection of persons and property on that property. Railway police are unique in Canada as they are the only sworn peace officers employed by a privately owned law enforcement agency. CPPS are "a fully authorized federal force, bound to uphold Canada's laws" and licensed to carry arms.

The main duties of a railway police officer are to protect the public using the company facilities, the employees and its assets. This includes public education on trespassing, school awareness programs, investigating crimes against the railway, assist the local police services, issuing tickets and many other duties including security of property and buildings. CP Rail assigns individual officers large sections of railway tracks to patrol and conduct active enforcement and public safety initiatives.

Leadership
As of February 2020, the head of the CP force was Chief Al Sauve.

Officers

The CP Police uniform consists of a dark blue shirt, dark blue cargo pants with body armour; they are armed with the usual police use-of-force equipment, as well as a Glock 9mm pistol, Remington 870 shotgun and Sig Sauer M400 patrol rifle. They are issued a standard police-style forage cap. In addition, CP police sometimes work in a plain-clothes capacity.

Years ago, the CP Police provided police services to union station buildings, CP Hotels, CP Ships and CP Air. CPR is now their main responsibility, as the above CP departments have been sold.

CP Police recruits attend different federal and provincial police academies as there is no government-mandated training college for railway police in Canada. Currently, CP Police have an agreement with the Lethbridge Police Service and the Lethbridge College in Alberta to provide recruit training to new officers. In 2010, CP Police used the Saskatchewan Municipal Police College (SKPC) to train recruits. The SKPC also offers continuing education and specialized courses to experienced members. Before 2010, CP Police recruits used to get their basic training at the RCMP Academy located at Depot in Regina, Saskatchewan.  For specialized police training, members may attend different provincial police colleges, as well as the Canadian Police College located in Ottawa.

All CP Police officers must have knowledge of federal and provincial laws as the railway properties cross many jurisdictions (federal, provincial, municipal, county) and have to collaborate with their respective police departments. The job of a railway police officer is sometimes lonely, patrolling miles of track alone, with little back-up. They are paid on par with regular police officers in Canada and similar benefits. CP Rail is a private company and pays taxes that includes public police protection, thus CPR has downsized their police department over several decades. CP Police numbers have remained steady at about 100 officers in the United States and Canada. Jurisdictional public police departments maintain the overall responsibility for public safety and law enforcement in their respective territories including CPR property. CP Police will assist local police if necessary, and conduct its own investigations. CPR also uses its police department to conduct investigations into employee conduct dealing with collective agreement violations involving alcohol and drugs, as well as criminal matters.

Fleet
Current:
 Ford Police Interceptor Utility Vehicle
 2009-2012 Ford Explorer
 Dodge Ram 4 X 4
 Ford F-150 4 X 4
 Chevrolet Silverado
Former:

 Ford Crown Victoria
 2009-2014 Ford F-150 4 X 4
 Dodge Magnum
 1997-2011 Dodge Dakota

Detachments

The Canadian Pacific Police Service has detachments in the following locations:
Montreal, QC
Sherbrooke, QC
Toronto, ON
Hamilton, ON
Windsor, ON
Sudbury, ON
Winnipeg, MB
Brandon, MB
Regina, SK
Moose Jaw, SK
Saskatoon, SK
Medicine Hat, AB
Lethbridge, AB
Calgary, AB
Edmonton, AB
Golden, BC
Revelstoke, BC
Cranbrook, BC
Kamloops, BC
Port Moody, BC

References

External links
 

Railroad police agencies
Railroad police departments of the United States
Private police
Canadian Pacific Railway